Solvent Yellow 7 is a common azo dye with a formula of  C6H5N2C6H4OH.

Synthesis 

Like most azobenzenes, Solvent Yellow 7 can be synthesized by the reaction of phenyldiazonium salt with phenol. The optimal pH value for this azo coupling is 8.5-10. The reaction is carried out in water, since sodium chloride (or potassium chloride) formed in the reaction is soluble in water, while the product precipitates.

References

See also 
 Benzenediazonium chloride
 Azo compound
Solvent Yellow 1

Phenols
Azo compounds